Sparrows Can't Sing is a 1963 British kitchen sink comedy film. Based on a 1960 play, Sparrers Can't Sing, it was directed by Joan Littlewood and was from a story by Stephen Lewis. The producer was Donald Taylor and the original music by James Stevens, incidental music was composed by Stanley Black. The play, also by Stephen Lewis, was first performed at Joan Littlewood's Theatre Workshop in the Theatre Royal Stratford East.

Play
The film is loosely based on the stage musical Fings Ain't Wot They Used To Be, written by Frank Norman with music by Lionel Bart, at Theatre Royal Stratford East in 1960, using members of the Theatre Workshop company, many of whom later appeared in the film. While the screenplay for the film was by Stephen Lewis, the stage version was partially developed using improvisational theatre techniques during performance. In common with much of Joan Littlewood's direction, it was an ensemble piece.

The production made a successful transfer to the West End at Wyndham's Theatre in 1961.

Film 
The film was made on location during the summer of 1962 in Limehouse, Isle of Dogs, Stepney, around the theatre in Stratford, and at Elstree Studios. Sets were occasionally visited by nearby Vallance Road residents the Kray twins. Some sources claim the Krays made a cameo appearance towards the end of the film, but film historian Richard Dacre states this is not the case.

Sparrows Can't Sing is a comedy attempting to provide a representation of Cockney life in the East End of London in the early 1960s. A collection of typical characters such as people at the local pub, local tarts, Jewish tradesmen, spivs and others are portrayed (and possibly larger than life).

The dialogue is a mixture of Cockney rhyming slang, London Yiddish, and thieves' cant. The New York Times said in its review: "this isn't a picture for anyone with a logical mind or an ear for language. The gabble of cockney spoken here is as incomprehensible as the reasoning of those who speak it." It was also the first English language film to be released in the United States with subtitles.

Plot 
Cockney sailor Charlie comes home from a long voyage to find his house razed and his wife Maggie missing. She is in fact now living with bus driver Bert and has a new baby – whose parentage is in doubt. Charlie's friends won't tell him where Maggie is because he is known to have a foul temper. But he finally finds her and, after a fierce row with Bert, they are reconciled.

Cast 
James Booth as Charlie Gooding
Barbara Windsor as Maggie Gooding
Roy Kinnear as Fred Gooding
Avis Bunnage as Bridgie Gooding
Barbara Ferris as Nellie Gooding
Brian Murphy as Jack
George Sewell as Bert
Griffith Davies as Chunky
Murray Melvin as Georgie
Arthur Mullard as Ted
Peggy Ann Clifford as Ted's Wife
Wally Patch as Watchman
Bob Grant as Perce
Stephen Lewis as Caretaker
Victor Spinetti as Arnold
Jenny Sontag as Momma
May Scagnelli as Gran
Fanny Carby as Lil
Yootha Joyce as Yootha
Janet Howse as Janet
Queenie Watts as Queenie
John Junkin as Bridge Operator
Harry H. Corbett as Greengrocer
Marjie Lawrence as Girl
Glynn Edwards as Charlie's Friend
Gerry Raffles as Lorry Driver
Rita Webb as Maggie's Neighbour (Uncredited)
Georgina Mitchell gypsy flower seller in pub
 Sarah Booth as baby in the pram. The biological daughter of James Booth.

Film release
The world premiere was held on 26 February 1963 at the ABC cinema on the Mile End Road, and was attended by the Earl of Snowdon. Post-film drinks were had across the road at the Kentucky Club, owned by the Kray twins, before the party moved on to another Kray establishment, Esmeralda's Barn in the West End.

The film opened at the Rialto Cinema in the West End on 27 February 1963.

Award 
Barbara Windsor was nominated for the award for Best Actress in a Leading Role by the British Academy Film Awards in 1963, for her performance as Maggie.

Home media 
A region B Blu-ray was released on 12 October 2015.

References 

  "Film Review" by Maurice Speed – Publisher: MacDonald, 1964

External links

James Booth tribute website: Sparrows Can't Sing

1963 films
British comedy films
British plays
1963 comedy films
British films based on plays
Social realism in film
Films shot at Associated British Studios
Films set in London
Films shot in London
1960s English-language films
1960s British films